Omaze is an American for-profit fundraising company which partners with charities in fundraising events. Omaze's events feature prizes, such as material goods, property, or celebrity experiences, usually with one grand prize and several lesser prizes. In order to enter the draw for the prizes, financial contributions are encouraged, with 15% to 60% of the money going to the partner charity.

The company was founded by Ryan Cummins and Matthew Pohlson in July 2012, is privately owned, and is based in Los Angeles, California. The company has raised over $130 million for over 350 charities, including UNICEF, After-School All-Stars, Julia's House, Product Red, and Make-A-Wish Foundation.

Contests 

Omaze will typically launch a sweepstake that offers a grand prize or experience, with a promotional video endorsed by a celebrity. Entrants are encouraged to contribute financially to the cause, with the amount given proportionally determining the number of sweepstake entries that person receives: a person donating $100 has ten times more chances to win than a person donating $10.

Sweepstake systems such as Omaze's include a "no purchase necessary" clause to avoid being classed as a lottery. In the US, participants may select an "enter for free" option to receive 2,000 entries at no cost, in the United Kingdom participants may submit a postal entry with no fee.

Omaze released their first sweepstakes in July 2012, with the winner becoming a judge on Cupcake Wars and all entries supported Team Rubicon.

In December 2015, Omaze partnered with Star Wars where people donated $10 to be entered to win the opportunity to visit the closed set of Star Wars: The Force Awakens. The experience raised more than $4.26 million to benefit UNICEF. The experience launch video was a 2016 Webby Award Honoree.

Model 
Omaze is a privately owned, for-profit company which has two models to raise funds for charities. Sweepstake entries for a celebrity experience (set visit, dinner date, tickets to a premiere, etc.) see 60% of the money donated to charity, 25% towards fees and Omaze's costs for advertising and creating content for the event, and 15% to Omaze as profit.

For prize-based experiences (like a car, vacation, or tuition), 15% goes to the charity, 70% to sourcing and shipping the prize, covering the winner's taxes,  processing credit card fees, and Omaze's costs in marketing and creating content for the experience, and 15% to Omaze in profit.

In the United Kingdom, Omaze gives 80% of the net profit from a sweepstake to the charity, after deducting the cost of the prize and marketing, and takes 20% as its profit.

The company launched its first campaign in the United Kingdom in 2020.

References 

Companies based in Culver City, California
American companies established in 2012
American fundraising websites
Online auction websites of the United States